Rhinoclavis aspera is a species of sea snail, a marine gastropod mollusk in the family Cerithiidae.

Description

Distribution

References

External links

Cerithiidae
Gastropods described in 1758
Taxa named by Carl Linnaeus